Lost Creek is an unincorporated community in Breathitt County, Kentucky. Lost Creek has a post office with ZIP code 41348, which opened on October 11, 1849.

References

Unincorporated communities in Breathitt County, Kentucky
Unincorporated communities in Kentucky